20 East End Avenue is a condominium apartment building on the Upper East Side of Manhattan in New York City. It was designed in a New Classical style by Robert A.M. Stern Architects. The building consists of 43 apartments, including two duplex townhomes, one maisonette and two penthouses.

History
20 East End Avenue was developed by Edward Baquero of Corigin Real Estate Group. An entry-level, two-bedroom apartment was initially priced at approximately $4.5 million and one of the two penthouses at $39 million. Renderings for the building were released in late 2014. Construction began in early 2015, and the building topped out in November 2015. Facade installation was complete in mid-2016, and residents moved into the building later that year.

Location
The building is located between 80th and 81st Streets, near Carl Schurz Park, on East End Avenue in Yorkville, Manhattan, a neighborhood in the Upper East Side. East End Avenue, on the eastern edge of the Upper East Side, has long been home to some of the city's richest residents including the late Vincent Astor and Gloria Vanderbilt.

Architecture
The building is similar to several others designed by Robert A. M. Stern. It was inspired by buildings constructed in the 1920s and 1930s and other pre-war buildings, particularly those designed by J.E.R. Carpenter and Rosario Candela. The building includes features often found in pre-war buildings, such as a porte-cochère, setbacks, and a brick and Indiana limestone façade. In 2019 the building won the distinguished Stanford White Award for residential architecture. The ceremony was held at the Metropolitan Club on New Yorks 5th Avenue which was designed by Stanford White in 1894. This is the second time Robert A.M. Stern has won this prize.  The first time was for 15 Central Park West in 2012. https://archinect.com/firms/release/150058034/20-east-end-avenue-wins-2019-stanford-white-award/150168208

Amenities
The building is one of the last in New York to incorporate wood-burning fireplaces after New York City banned the creation of new ones in 2014. Other amenities include a gym, library, billiards room, poker room, wine cellar, private dining room, spa and storage facilities.

See also
 15 Central Park West
 70 Vestry

References

Residential buildings completed in 2016
Upper East Side
Condominiums and housing cooperatives in Manhattan
Robert A. M. Stern buildings